is a Japanese professional footballer currently playing as a winger for  club Kashima Antlers.

Career statistics

Club
.

Notes

References

External links

2002 births
Living people
Association football people from Saitama Prefecture
Japanese footballers
Association football midfielders
Omiya Ardija players
Kashima Antlers players
Zweigen Kanazawa players